Thomas Schneider (born 6 September 1964, in Göttingen) is a German Egyptologist.

Life and career 
Thomas Schneider began his studies in 1984 at the University of Zurich, focusing on history, Egyptology and Hebrew. He transferred to the University of Basel in 1986, where he achieved a MA in Egyptology, Ancient History and Old Testament Studies in 1990. He carried out further study at the Collège de France in Paris before completing his PhD in Egyptology at the University of Basel in 1996. In 1999 he completed his habilitation at the same university.

Thomas Schneider became the professor of Egyptology at the University of Wales, in Swansea. Before that, he was a visiting professor at the universities of Vienna, Warsaw and Heidelberg, professor of the National Swiss Research Association at the Institute of Egyptology at Basel and participated in the MISR Project (Mission Siptah-Ramses X in the Valley of the Kings) of the University of Basel. Since 2007, he has been an Associate Professor of Egyptology and the Near East at the University of British Columbia.

Schneider published the works of  Gesammelte Schriften zur Semitohamitistik (Collected Works on Afro-Asiatic languages) stating that "none of the published works of this scholar have been excluded from the new publication." But in fact, he excluded a large portion of Rössler's numerous Nazi writings, written before 1945, which were produced in close collaboration with the Reich Security Main Office, where Rössler worked as an "expert" to help propagate the idea of Hitler as a savior figure for contemporary Islam in order to improve Nazi Germany's place in the Arab world.

Area of research 
Since 1987, Thomas Schneider has pursued various research interests focussed on Egypt. His main areas of research are the political, cultural and intellectual history of Egypt, the relationship of ancient Egypt to the Near East, North Africa and the Aegean, the phonology of ancient Egyptian, connections between ancient Egyptian and the Afro-Asiatic languages, and the history of Egyptology.

Selected publications

External links 
 
 Personal website of Thomas Schneider at the University of British Columbia

German Egyptologists
Canadian Egyptologists
Academic staff of the University of British Columbia
Academics of Swansea University
Academic staff of the University of Basel
1964 births
Living people
Writers from Göttingen
Archaeologists from Lower Saxony